This is a list of the most notable softcore erotic films and sex comedy films produced in France (including co-productions).

List
{| class="wikitable" width= "100%"
|-
! width=20% | Title
! width=15% | Director
! width=25% | Cast
! width=12% | Genre
! width=30% | Notes
|-
|  | 1967
|-
| Belle de Jour || Luis Buñuel || Catherine Deneuve, Jean Sorel, Michel Piccoli || Drama||
|-
|  | 1971
|-
| Good Little Girls(Les Petites Filles modèles) || Jean-Claude Roy || Marie-Georges Pascal, Michèle Girardon, Bella Darvi || Comedy||
|-
| Requiem pour un Vampire || Jean Rollin || Marie-Pierre Castel, Mireille Dargent, Philippe Gasté|| Horror / Fantastic || 
|-
| I Am a Nymphomaniac || Max Pécas || Sandra Julien, Janine Reynaud, Michel Lemoine|| comedy / Fantasy || 
|-
| Blanche || Walerian Borowczyk || Michel Simon, Ligia Branice,Georges Wilson|| Drama / Historic || 
|-
|  | 1972
|-
| Last Tango in Paris || Bernardo Bertolucci || Marlon Brando, Maria Schneider,Jean-Pierre Léaud || Romantic / Drama|| 
|-
|  | 1973
|-
| I Am Frigid... Why? ||Max Pécas || Sandra Julien, Marie-Georges Pascal, Catherine Wagener ||Drama ||
|-
| Immoral Tales ||Walerian Borowczyk || Paloma Picasso, Charlotte Alexandra, Fabrice Luchini  ||anthology  || 
|-
| Marianne's Temptations ||Francis Leroi || Rosa Fumetto, Bob Asklöf, Bernard Tixier ||Drama ||
|-
| Bananes mécaniques || Jean-François Davy || Marie-Georges Pascal, Anne Libert, Pauline Larrieu || Comedy||
|-
| Don Juan, or If Don Juan Were a Woman ||Roger Vadim || Brigitte Bardot, Robert Hossein, Jane Birkin || Drama || 
|-
| Female Vampire(La Comtesse noire)  ||Jesús Franco || Lina Romay, Jack Taylor, Monica Swinn  || Horror / Fantastic || 
|-
|  | 1974
|-
| Going Places(Les Valseuses) || Bertrand Blier || Gérard Depardieu, Patrick Dewaere,Miou-Miou  || Comedy / Drama || 
|-
| Les Démoniaques || Jean Rollin || Joëlle Coeur, Willy Braque, Mireille Dargent  || Horror / Fantastic || 
|-
| Hot and Naked || Guy Maria || Marie-Georges Pascal, Bob Asklöf,Jean-Michel Dhermay  || Action / Drama || 
|-
| Emmanuelle || Just Jaeckin || Sylvia Kristel, Alain Cuny,Christine Boisson|| Romantic || 
|-
|  | 1975
|-
| La Bête ||Walerian Borowczyk || Sirpa Lane, Lisbeth Hummel, Marcel Dalio  ||Comedy / Horror / Drama ||  
|-
| Emmanuelle 2 || Francis Giacobetti || Sylvia Kristel, Laura Gemser,Umberto Orsini || Romantic || 
|-
| Maîtresse || Barbet Schroeder ||Bulle Ogier, Gérard Depardieu,André Rouyer  || Comedy || 
|-
| Story of O ||Just Jaeckin ||Corinne Cléry, Udo Kier, Anthony Steel   || Drama  ||
|-
|  | 1976|-
| Spermula ||Charles Matton ||Udo Kier, Dayle Haddon, Karin Petersen || fantasy ||
|-
|  | 1977|-
| Bilitis||David Hamilton||Patti D'Arbanville, Bernard Giraudeau, Mathieu Carrière ||Romantic / Drama|| 
|-
|  | 1978|-
| Goodbye Emmanuelle||François Leterrier|| Sylvia Kristel, Olga Georges-Picot, Umberto Orsini ||Romantic || 
|-
|  | 1979|-
| Fascination ||Jean Rollin || Brigitte Lahaie Franka Mai,Jean-Pierre Lemaire|| Fantastic|| 
|-
| Laura ||David Hamilton || Maud Adams Dawn Dunlap,James Mitchell|| Romantic|| 
|-
|  | 1980|-
| Tendres Cousines||David Hamilton ||Thierry Tevini Anja Schüte,Valérie Dumas ||Romantic || 
|-
|  | 1981|-
| A Summer in St. Tropez||David Hamilton|| Anne, Monica Broeke, Catherine ||Romantic / Drama || 
|-
| Beau-père||Bertrand Blier|| Patrick Dewaere, Ariel Besse ||Melodrama / Drama || 
|-
|  | 1984|-
| Premiers désirs||David Hamilton|| Monica Broeke, Patrick Bauchau, Emmanuelle Béart ||Romantic  || 
|-
| Emmanuelle 4||Francis Leroi, Iris Letans|| Mia Nygren, Sylvia Kristel,Dominique Troyes || Romantic / Drama|| 
|-
|  | 1987|-
| Emmanuelle 5||Walerian Borowczyk|| Monique Gabrielle, Crofton Hardester, Dana Burns Westburg ||Romantic / Drama || 
|-
|  | 1992|-
| The Lover (film)||Jean-Jacques Annaud|| Jane March ||Romantic / Drama || 
|-
|  | 2006|-
| Lady Chatterley||Pascale Ferran|| Marina Hands, Jean‑Louis Coulloc'h ||Drama ||
|-
|  | 2013|-
| Blue Is the Warmest Colour'||Abdellatif Kechiche|| Léa Seydoux, Adèle Exarchopoulos ||Romantic / Drama || 
|-

|}

References

Sources
 Dictionnaire des films français pornographiques et érotiques en 16 et 35 mm'', Serious Publishing 2011, directed by Christophe Bier
 The 2 Unforgettable French Erotic Movies – Old and New

French erotic films